All Our Yesterdays is the debut EP by American post-hardcore band, Verah Falls. Released on June 7, 2011.

Reception 
The album received mixed reviews. Ryan Williford of online review site Audiopinions stated that "The instrumental parts were well written and there is nothing here that is beyond their skill or them trying to force anything into a song. One of the best factors about the band is that nothing takes priority over another aspect of the sound.", while Vic Vaughn of Metal review site MetalSucks simply stated that "Uh, wow, another shitty melodic emo-screamo hard-kee-yore band. It sucks. Ignore it."

Track listing

Personnel 
Verah Falls
Craig Prater - Vocals
Tyler Wenz - Drums
Kyle Gilmer - Guitar
Forrest Burton - Guitar
Graham Brown - Bass

Production
Production, recording and mixing by Stephan Hawkes

References 

2011 debut EPs
Post-hardcore EPs